The 2016 U.S. Men's Clay Court Championships (also known as the Fayez Sarofim & Co. U.S. Men's Clay Court Championships for sponsorship purposes) was a tennis tournament played on outdoor clay courts. It was the 48th edition of the U.S. Men's Clay Court Championships, and an ATP World Tour 250 event on the 2016 ATP World Tour. It took place at River Oaks Country Club in Houston, Texas, United States, from April 4 through April 10, 2016.

Singles main draw entrants

Seeds

Rankings are as of March 21, 2016.

Other entrants
The following players received wildcards into the main draw:
  Tommy Paul
  Frances Tiafoe
  Tim Smyczek

The following player received entry with a protected ranking:
 Dmitry Tursunov

The following players received entry via the qualifying draw:
  Matthew Barton
  Carlos Berlocq
  Nicolás Kicker
  Mischa Zverev

The following player received entry as a lucky loser:
  Reilly Opelka

Withdrawals
Before the tournament
  Kevin Anderson → replaced by  Dmitry Tursunov
  Mikhail Kukushkin → replaced by  Lukas Lacko
  Leonardo Mayer → replaced by  Benjamin Becker
  John Millman → replaced by  Reilly Opelka

Doubles main draw entrants

Seeds

 Rankings are as of March 21, 2016.

Other entrants
The following pairs received wildcards into the doubles main draw:
  Marcus Daniell /  Artem Sitak
  Reilly Opelka /  Tommy Paul

The following pair received entry as alternates:
  Guido Andreozzi /  Nicolás Kicker

Withdrawals
Before the tournament
  Dustin Brown (wrist injury)

During the tournament
  Philipp Petzschner (knee injury)

Finals

Singles

  Juan Mónaco defeated  Jack Sock, 3–6, 6–3, 7–5

Doubles

  Bob Bryan /  Mike Bryan defeated  Víctor Estrella Burgos /  Santiago González, 4–6, 6–3, [10–8]

References

External links

Official website

 
U.S. Men's Clay Court Championships
U.S. Men's Clay Court Championships
Usmensclay
U.S. Men's Clay Court Championships